The Seventh-day Adventist Church is a major Christian denomination with a small presence in Turks and Caicos Islands with a reported 3,864 members as of June 30, 2020.

History

The first Sabbath keepers were discovered in the Turks and Caicos Islands on Grand Turk Island in 1906 by a Jamaican colporteur as he sold books.

The Review and Herald of November 16, 1905 noted that “A woman on one of the Turks Islands at the turn of the twentieth century had come to recognize the seventh-day Sabbath through reading her Bible.”

Since 1906 the work in the islands has had its ups and down, however it was not until 1945 that the territory saw the establishment of a permanent presence of the denomination. In 1945 Clyde Nebblett a colporteur migrated to Grand Turk with his wife and began a small group that met in their home. Later that year the island of Grand Turk was devastated by the 1945 Homestead hurricane. This forced the Nedletts to move to Providenciales in the community of Blue Hills where 26 individuals were baptized through their efforts. In December of the same year the Turks and Caicos Islands along with Mayaguana of the Bahamas were organized into the Salt Cays Mission.

In 1947 the believers on Grand Turk were organized into a church after an evangelistic campaign and Pastor Gordon Prenier purchased a warehouse and transformed it into the first Adventist Church building in the Turks and Caicos. Between 1950 and 1988 the territory fluctuated between mission and district categorization. “In January 1988 it reverted to mission status under the direction of West Indies Union.”  
	
When the mission was organized, it became a part of the West Indies Union Conference. West Indies Union comprised the conferences in Jamaica, the Bahamas, the Turks and Caicos Islands Mission, and the Cayman Islands Conference. 
 
In November 2010 at Northern Caribbean University in Mandeville, Jamaica, West Indies Union was dissolved and gave birth to the Atlantic Caribbean Union Mission and the Jamaica Union Conference. “The new configuration will see the formation of the Atlantic Caribbean Union Mission, comprising four Fields: the Bahamas Conference (now South Bahamas Conference), the North Bahamas Conference, the Cayman Islands Conference, and the Turks and Caicos Islands Mission, with approximately 25,000 members.”

Seventh-day Adventism has moved in sync with the population growth of the Turks and Caicos Islands, hence Providenciales, the economic hub of the country has become the island that has seen the most growth over the years.

Social Works

In 1971 the Turks and Caicos Islands Mission opened a high school on the Island of South Caicos. The name of the school was Pearson High. It was named after Robert H. Pearson who conducted a tent evangelistic campaign for a month in Grand Turk and was instrumental in the organization of the mission in 1945. “Unfortunately, this school ran into financial difficulties and had to be closed in 1979.”

In 2001 the Mission under the leadership of the then president Pastor Peter Kerr opened a high school on the island of Providenciales named Maranatha High school now Maranatha Academy.

The Antioch Seventh-day Adventist Church in Grand Turk also operates a school by the name of Newman’s Preparatory.

See also
Australian Union Conference of Seventh-day Adventists
Seventh-day Adventist Church in Brazil
Seventh-day Adventist Church in Canada
Seventh-day Adventist Church in the People's Republic of China
Seventh-day Adventist Church in Colombia
Seventh-day Adventist Church in Cuba
Seventh-day Adventist Church in India
Italian Union of Seventh-day Adventist Churches
Seventh-day Adventist Church in Ghana
New Zealand Pacific Union Conference of Seventh-day Adventists
Seventh-day Adventist Church in Nigeria
Adventism in Norway
Romanian Union Conference of Seventh-day Adventists
Seventh-day Adventist Church in Sweden
Seventh-day Adventist Church in Thailand
Seventh-day Adventist Church in Tonga

References

Christian denominations in the Turks and Caicos Islands
History of the Seventh-day Adventist Church
Turks and Caicos Islands
Seventh-day Adventist Church in North America